The Maya–Yunga–Chipayan languages are a proposed macrofamily linking the Chimuan, Uru–Chipaya, and Mayan language families of the Americas. The macrofamily was proposed by Stark (1972). However, it has not gained widespread acceptance among linguists.

Classification
Stark's (1972) classification is as follows.

Maya–Yunga–Chipayan
Mayan
Chimu–Chipayan
Uru–Chipaya
Chimuan
Yunga (Mochica)
Cañari–Puruhá
? Sechura–Catacao (Tallán)

Tovar (1961), partly based on Schmidt (1926), adds Tallán (Sechura–Catacao) to Chimuan (which he calls Yunga-Puruhá). Tovar's (1961) classification below is cited from Stark (1972).

Lexical comparisons
Stark (1972) proposed a Maya–Yunga–Chipayan macrofamily linking Mayan with Uru–Chipaya and Yunga (Mochica), based on the following lexical comparisons.

{| class="wikitable sortable"
! gloss !! Yunga !! Uru–Chipaya !! Proto-Mayan
|-
| to remember || kon- || khuñ- || *k(’)an
|-
| string (twisted) || pal || pari || *b’əl
|-
| flea || čuka || čowksmari || *k’əq
|-
| to kill || jum || kan || *kəm
|-
| fire || ox || uh || *q’aːq’
|-
| foot || xok || kxohča || *ʔoːq
|-
| to come || ta(n)- || thon- || *t̪əːl
|-
| (old) woman || šonøŋ || šon || *ʔišnam
|-
| beard || sap || sip(s) || *šob
|-
| white || šiku || sḳo ‘white, salty residue, on ground’ || *saq
|-
| to spin thread || paṣ̌- || spahtš || *bač’
|-
| water || xa || kxaʔ || *həʔ
|-
| bone || ko¢ike || khoči || *b’a.q
|-
| to feel, hear || nøm- || non || *ʔabiy, *ʔubiy
|-
| sun, time, day || tuni || thuñi || *q’i.ŋ
|-
| father || ef || ehp || *mam, *tat
|-
| to want, love, present || pik- || pek || *q’an, *ʔax
|-
| ripe, old || čuk || čakwa || *yix
|-
| toad || xok || šḳoḳa || *š-k’yuk’y
|-
| to spin thread || paṣ̌- || spahtš || *š-bač’
|-
| jaw || kaŋ || škeña || *š-kahlam
|-
| cornfield ||  || škala ~ ṣkala || *š-k’wal; *š-kol
|}

See also
Macro-Mayan languages

References

Proposed language families
Indigenous languages of South America
Mesoamerican languages